Fritz Erik Elmsäter (7 October 1919 – 9 March 2006) was the first Swedish athlete to compete in both the Summer and Winter Olympics. In 1948 he won a silver medal in the 3000 m steeplechase race, and finished 19th in the 18 km cross-country skiing and 9th in the Nordic combined event. At the 1952 Winter Olympics, he was the flag bearer for Sweden, and finished 56th in the 18 km skiing race and 13th in the Nordic combined.

Biography
He was born Erik Pettersson and changed his name to Fritz Erik Elmsäter in 1939. A multitalented athlete, he played as a football goalkeeper in the 1930s, and competed in modern pentathlon, military relays and gymnastics. He had his best results in the 3000 m steeplechase. In this event he won four national titles in 1943–1946 and set two world records, becoming in 1944 the first person to run the steeplechase within nine minutes. He won silver medals at the 1946 European Championships and at the 1948 Olympics.

Elmsäter was a career military officer, retiring in 1959 to accept a position at the Swedish Sports Federation. In the 1960s he worked for the Swedish radio and TV network, and between 1968 and 1985 held various managerial position at the Sveriges Television. His daughter Eva is a prominent journalist.

Cross-country skiing results

Olympic Games

References

External links

18 km Olympic cross country results: 1948–52
BrainyHistory.com information on Elmsäter
Olympic nordic combined results: 1948–64
Swedish athletic medalists at Olympic, European, and World Championships.

1919 births
2006 deaths
Athletes from Stockholm
Athletes (track and field) at the 1948 Summer Olympics
Nordic combined skiers at the 1948 Winter Olympics
Nordic combined skiers at the 1952 Winter Olympics
Cross-country skiers at the 1948 Winter Olympics
Cross-country skiers at the 1952 Winter Olympics
Swedish male long-distance runners
Olympic silver medalists for Sweden
Olympic athletes of Sweden
Olympic Nordic combined skiers of Sweden
Olympic cross-country skiers of Sweden
Swedish male cross-country skiers
Swedish male Nordic combined skiers
Swedish male steeplechase runners
European Athletics Championships medalists
Medalists at the 1948 Summer Olympics
Olympic silver medalists in athletics (track and field)